The Kuwait National Guard or National Guard (KNG) is an independent combat institution tasked mainly with the defense of the country and its territories. The National Guard traces its heritage directly to the cavalrymen and infantrymen that defended Kuwait's three mounted defensive walls. Since its inception, the Kuwait National Guard under the guidance of the respective leadership; executed, participated and supported in carrying all conflicts in which the Military of the State of Kuwait engaged since 1967.

Creation and patron 
The founding of the Kuwait National Guard was first conceived during the Six-Day War and following the outcomes of Operation Vantage when Sheikh Jaber Al-Ahmad Al-Sabah was the Crown Prince of Kuwait through the 2nd decree of 1967 on June 6 during the reign of the Emir of Kuwait, Sheikh Sabah Al-Salim Al-Sabah. A mission for this purpose was led by Sheikh Salem Ali Al-Salem Al-Sabah, who was the driving force in forming the various tasks forces within the National Guard and who has remained at the head of the institution since its enacting in 1967.

Leadership

National Guard Commander

Deputy National Guard Commanders

History

50th Anniversary of the Kuwait National Guard 

In June 2017, the Kuwait National Guard commemorated their 50th Anniversary Golden jubilee under the leadership of the Commander-in-chief, the Emir of Kuwait, and directives of Sheikh Salem Al-Ali Al-Sabah.

Equipment

Armored Fighting Vehicles

References

External links 
 Kuwait National Guard official page

Military of Kuwait
Military units and formations established in 1967